The Ponta Delgada Football Association is the governing body for association football and futsal competitions in the Portuguese former-district of Ponta Delgada. This organization regulates football in the Azorean islands of São Miguel and Santa Maria.

History

The foundation of the Football Association began with the growth of many social and cultural institutes and organizations, unrelated to organized sport. One was the Ateneu Comercial de Ponta Delgada (Commercial Athenaeum of Ponta Delgada) at the edge of celebrating its first century of existence, and that inherited a voluminous and well-elaborated place in the society and culture. The Associação de Socorros Mútuos União e Trabalho which began in the last century, and helped to motivate public training, that formed schools, including one in Lagoa. The Sociedade Promotora de Instrução e Recreio (Society for the Promotion of Training and Recreation), who had a century of existence, but which eventually ceased, providing an important role in the social context, during the many festivals and cultural activities.

Within the Ateneu Comercial functioned the Associação Auxiliadora do Ensino Industrial e Comercial (Auxiliary Association of Commercial and Industrial Training) taught by professors António Maria Lopes (Portuguese) and Urbano de Arruda Carreiro (Accounting). Further, there was the commercial course of the Associação dos Empregados do Comércio e Indústria do Distrito Oriental dos Açores (Association of Commercial and Industrial Employees of the Eastern District of the Azores), which ended in the middle of the 20th century, when the Escola Industrial e Comercial de Ponta Delgada (Industrial and Commercial School of Ponta Delgada) began to operate, under the direction of Governaor Rafael Sérgio Vieira, at the Solar Jácome Correia (later site of the Roberto Ivens Secondary School).

At the beginning of the 20th century, the Liga Micaelense de Instrução Pública (Micalense League of Public Instruction) founded by Aires Jácome Correia, then Marquess of Jácome Correia, operated unnoticed, if not for the acts of the Ponta Delgada Cultural Institute. One of the two initiatives, that were generously financed, was the Escola Industrial de Rendas de Bilro (Industrial School of Rendas de Bilro), which survived, with the activities of female youth in the 1930s (along a building of Rua do Brum). Also around this time, at the end of 1911 and beginning of 192, was the celebrated Sociedade Promotora da Agricultura Micaelense (Promotional Society of Micalense Agriculture), with many meetings at the building along Alameda Duque de Bragança, seat of the Meteorological Observatory Afonso de Chaves for more than 50 years. Dating from 1843, this organization had its agricultural garden, that later were sold off to João Augusto Carreiro de Mendonça, along Rua Diário dos Açores, later the Banco Comercial dos Açores offices.

It was in the Sociedade Promotora da Agricultura Micaelense, Sociedade Promotora da Instrução 
e Recreio and the Sociedade dos Amigos das Letras e das Artes, founded in 1884 by António Feliciano de Castilho, that fomented the associative movement of São Miguel, managing several initiatives and, ultimately, founding other organizations, sport clubs and the need to form a football association in Ponta Delgada.

Football
A few Micalense educated in the United Kingdom, travelling on holiday, brought a football, and in 1898, formed two groups: one in red, and the other blue, facing-off in the pitch of the agricultural market of São Gonçalo. Both groups consisted of the early pioneers of football to the island: Rolando de Viveiros, Marquês de Jácome Correia, Weber Tavares, Edgardo Garcia and Alfredo Pinto, along with other locals, José de Carvalho, António Botelho da Câmara, José Morais Pereira, Padre James Machin (do Colégio Fisher), Raul Pregadeiro, Alberto Morais de Carvalho, Martiniano da Silva, Ernesto Pinto, Guilherme Machado de Faria e Maia, Manuel da Silva, Joaquim Correia e Silva, among others. Dr. Aristides Moreira da Mota, João de Morais Pereira and João José de Viveiros occupied the positions of leaders, thus stimulating, with the prestige of his name and his age, the sporting initiative.

At end of the 19th and early 20th century, the newspapers, and specifically the paper A Persusão, directed by Francisco Maria Supico, celebrated the achievements of several organizations. But, it was just after the First World War, that football began to be practiced regularly, such as the Mata do Doca, where stationed North American forces during the war could be found, increasing local commerce.

Member clubs
Member clubs include:
Clube Desportivo Santa Clara - Ponta Delgada - Primeira Liga
Clube Operário Desportivo - Lagoa -  Segunda II Divisão
Capelense Sport Clube - Capelas - Terceira Divisão
Clube União Micaelense - Ponta Delgada - Terceira Divisão
Santiago Futebol Clube - Água de Pau - Terceira Divisão
Sporting Clube Ideal - Ribeira Grande - Terceira Divisão
Águia Clube Desportivo - Arrifes - District (Distritais)
Clube Desportivo Rabo de Peixe - Rabo de Peixe - District (Distritais)
Futebol Clube Vale Formoso - Furnas -  - District (Distritais)
Grupo Desportivo São Roque - Ponta Delgada - District (Distritais)
Grupo Desportivo Bota Fogo - Ponta Garça - District (Distritais)
Mira Mar Sport Clube -Povoação - District (Distritais)
Vitória Clube do Pico da Pedra - Pico da Pedra - District (Distritais)
União Desportiva do Nordeste - Nordeste - District (Distritais)
Clube Desportivo Santo António - Ponta Delgada
Clube Desportivo Santo António Nordestinho - Nordeste
Maia Clube dos Açores - Maia, Ribeira Grande
Marítimo Sport Clube - Ponta Delgada

Current divisions
The AF Ponta Delgada runs the following division covering the fifth tier of the Portuguese football league system.

Capelense Sport Clube
Clube Desportivo Rabo de Peixe
Clube Desportivo Santa Clara
Futebol Clube Vale Formoso
Grupo Desportivo Bota Fogo
Grupo Desportivo de São Roque
Mira Mar Sport Clube
União Desportiva de Nordeste

See also
Portuguese District Football Associations
Portuguese football competitions
List of football clubs in Portugal

References 
Notes

Sources
 
 

Portuguese District Football Associations
Football in the Azores
Organisations based in the Azores
Sports organizations established in 1921